Horsham Riverside is an electoral division of West Sussex in the United Kingdom and returns one member to sit on West Sussex County Council.

Extent
The division covers the southeastern part of the town of Horsham.

It comprises the following Horsham District wards: Forest Ward, the eastern part of Horsham Park Ward and the western part of Roffey South Ward; and of the following civil parishes: the eastern part of Horsham and the southern part of North Horsham.

Election results

2013 Election
Results of the election held on 2 May 2013:

2009 Election
Results of the election held on 4 June 2009:

2005 Election
Results of the election held on 5 May 2005

References
Election Results - West Sussex County Council

External links
 West Sussex County Council
 Election Maps

Electoral Divisions of West Sussex